The Salvation Army Girl (German:Das Mädchen von der Heilsarmee) is a 1927 German silent film directed by William Kahn and starring Camilla von Hollay, Toni Ebärg and Ernst Rückert.

The film's art direction was by August Rinaldi.

Cast
 Camilla von Hollay 
 Toni Ebärg 
 Ernst Rückert
 Valy Arnheim 
 Siegfried Berisch 
 Otto Kronburger 
 Sylvia Torf

References

Bibliography
 Grange, William. Cultural Chronicle of the Weimar Republic. Scarecrow Press, 2008.

External links

1927 films
Films of the Weimar Republic
Films directed by William Kahn
German silent feature films
German black-and-white films